Almost Home may refer to:

Music 
"Almost Home" (Craig Morgan song), 2002
"Almost Home" (Mariah Carey song), 2013
"Almost Home" (Mary Chapin Carpenter song), 1999
Almost Home (Virginia Coalition EP), 2008
Almost Home (Kid Ink EP), 2013 EP by rapper Kid Ink
Almost Home (album), a 2009 album by Evergreen Terrace
"Almost Home", a song by Moby, from the album Innocents

Other 
The Torkelsons/Almost Home, an American situation comedy
Almost Home (Canadian TV series), a Canadian educational television program
Almost Home (novel), a 2007 novel by Jessica Blank